The Golden Crescent Regional Planning Commission (GCRPC) is a voluntary association of cities, counties and special districts in southern Texas.

Based in Victoria, the Golden Crescent Regional Planning Commission is a member of the Texas Association of Regional Councils.

Counties served
Calhoun
DeWitt
Goliad
Gonzales
Jackson
Lavaca
Victoria

Largest cities in the region
Victoria
Port Lavaca
Gonzales
Cuero
Edna
Yoakum

References

External links
Golden Crescent Regional Planning Commission - Official site.

Texas Association of Regional Councils